Verghereto (Tuscan:  (rare)) is a comune (municipality) in the Province of Forlì-Cesena in the Italian region Emilia-Romagna, located about  southeast of Bologna and about  south of Forlì.

The main parish church is San Michele Arcangelo, Verghereto.

Twin towns
Verghereto is twinned with the following towns:

 Source-Seine, France, since 2002. Verghereto was originally a twin town of Saint-Germain-Source-Seine prior to the commune's fusion with Blessey on 1 January 2009 to form Source-Seine, when Verghereto became a twin town of Source-Seine. The commune of Saint-Germain-Source-Seine and the commune of Verghereto signed a friendship charter in 2001 and a sister town agreement in 2002. As the source of the Tiber is located in Verghereto and the source of the Seine is located in Source-Seine, the partnership is therefore between two communes which contain the sources of rivers that traverse European capital cities.
 Melissano, Italy, since 2007

References

External links
 Official website

Cities and towns in Emilia-Romagna